Emre Çolak (born 20 May 1991) is a Turkish former professional footballer who played as an attacking midfielder or a winger.

Emre has represented Turkey at every youth international level, before making his senior debut in a FIFA World Cup qualifier against Romania in 2012 under coach Abdullah Avcı.

Club career

Galatasaray

He began his football career playing for amateur side Atışalanıspor, before being invited to train with Beşiktaş for several months, but he eventually chose to return to his first club. After continuing his impressive performance at Atışalanıspor, he was finally scouted by Galatasaray, where he eventually joined the Youth Academy at the age of 13.

Emre rose through the ranks of the Galatasaray youth and academy team, and was promoted to the first team during the 2009–10 season. He scored two goals on his first team debut, in a cup match against Denizli Belediyespor on 17 January 2010. He made his league debut for Gala in a home match against Gaziantepspor coming on as a substitute in the second half for Arda Turan. He scored his first league goal on the final day of the 2009–10 season, in a 2–1 away loss to Gençlerbirliği.

Emre started to play mainly in the 2011-2012 season and scored his first goals of the season against İstanbul Başakşehir as Galatasaray won 4–1. On 25 January 2012, Emre scored another goal against Ankaragücü in a 4–0 win.

On 16 February 2012, his contract was extended for 2 years until 2016.

On 19 September 2012, he made his UEFA Champions League debut in a Group match against Manchester United, impressing as a second-half substitute in a game with Galatasaray narrowly lost 1–0. He scored his first goal for the season against rivals Beşiktaş as Galatasaray won 2–1.

Deportivo de La Coruña 
On 27 May 2016, his switch to the La Liga side Deportivo de La Coruña on a three-year contract was announced.

Fatih Karagümrük
On 16 December 2020, Emre signed for Süper Lig club Fatih Karagümrük.

Intercity
In January 2023, Çolak returned to Spain to join Intercity on a deal until the end of the season.

On 13 February 2023, Çolak announced his retirement from football.

Career statistics

Club
.

International

Honours
Galatasaray
Süper Lig (3): 2011–12, 2012–13, 2014–15
Türkiye Kupası (3): 2013–14, 2014–15, 2015–16
Süper Kupa (3): 2012, 2013, 2015

References

External links

Statistics at TFF.org 
 
 

1991 births
Living people
Footballers from Istanbul
Turkish footballers
Association football midfielders
Galatasaray A2 footballers
Galatasaray S.K. footballers
Süper Lig players
La Liga players
Saudi Professional League players
Segunda División players
TFF First League players
Deportivo de La Coruña players
Al-Wehda Club (Mecca) players
Fatih Karagümrük S.K. footballers
Hatayspor footballers
İstanbul Başakşehir F.K. players
Göztepe S.K. footballers
CF Intercity players
Turkey B international footballers
Expatriate footballers in Spain
Expatriate footballers in Saudi Arabia
Turkish expatriate sportspeople in Spain
Turkish expatriate sportspeople in Saudi Arabia
Turkey international footballers
Turkey under-21 international footballers
Turkey youth international footballers